Nahuelbuta National Park is one of the few parks located in La Araucanía Region of Chile's Coastal Mountain Range. It sits atop the highest part of the Cordillera de Nahuelbuta. Created in 1939, it consists of 6,832 hectares situated just 162 km northeast of Temuco. Nahuelbuta (Mapuche for "big tiger") is a sanctuary for monkey puzzle trees, with specimens dating back 2,000 years.

Flora
In addition to monkey puzzle trees, the park is also home to coigüe, ñirre, oak, lenga, orchids, carnivorous plants.

Fauna
The park provides habitat for the mountain lion, the pudú, a small Chilean deer, and Darwin's fox. Among the birds are the Magellanic woodpecker, the Andean tapaculo and the chucao tapaculo.

Destinations
The park features 30 roads and 15 trails that can be explored by car or foot. The National Forest Corporation (Chile) information center and camping area are both found in Pehuenco, where the most popular route begins. Following it will treat you to over four kilometers of scenic paths before ending at Cerro Piedra del Águila (1,379 meters). The peak offers a terrific view of the park's exuberant and pristine natural wonders, the immensity of the Pacific Ocean to the west, and an impressive chain of Andean volcanoes to the east. Other peaks include Cerro Anay and Alto Nahuelbuta, part of the Cordillera de Nahuelbuta. At sundown, you can enjoy the most sublime postcard view Nahuelbuta has to offer: a sky marked by red and pink hues framed by hundreds of thousand-year-old monkey puzzle trees. The administration of the park is located in Pehuenco, which is about 42 km from Angol. There are 10 camping sites here, with picnic tables, fire areas, rustic toilets and water.  It is open to the public all year round.

References

  Parque Nacional Nahuelbuta

Protected areas of La Araucanía Region
Protected areas established in 1939
National parks of Chile
Hiking trails in Chile
1939 establishments in Chile